Charles De Sorgher (born 14 November 1930) was a Belgian bobsledder who competed in the early 1950s. At the 1952 Winter Olympics in Oslo, he finished 18th in the two-man event.

References
1952 bobsleigh two-man results

External links

Belgian male bobsledders
Olympic bobsledders of Belgium
Bobsledders at the 1952 Winter Olympics
Living people
1930 births
Place of birth missing (living people)
20th-century Belgian people